The Charleswood Hawks are a Canadian junior ice hockey team currently based in Winnipeg, Manitoba, Canada. Established in 1970, the Hawks a charter member of the Manitoba Major Junior Hockey League (MMJHL)

Eric Coy Arena is the home of the Hawks, who are the most successful team in the history of MMJHL. The Charleswood Hawks have won the Art Moug Trophy 14 times and the Jack Mackenzie Trophy 16 times.

League championships

Jack Mackenzie Trophy (playoffs) 
 1973-74, 1978-79, 1980-81, 1993-94, 1994-95, 1995-96, 1996-97, 2001-02, 2002-03, 2004-05, 2005-06, 2006-07, 2008-09, 2009-10, 2010-11, 2011-12, 2012-13

Art Moug Trophy (regular season)
 1973-74, 1980-81, 1995-96, 1996-97, 1997-98, 2001-02, 2002-03, 2004-05, 2006-07, 2007-08, 2008-09, 2010-11, 2011-12, 2012-13, 2016-17

References

External links
Charleswood Hawks 

Ice hockey teams in Winnipeg
Charleswood, Winnipeg